Garden of Eden is a 1954 nudist film directed by Max Nosseck. It was co-produced by Walter Bibo (born on 13 April 1903 in New York City), and Norval E. Packwood.  Outdoor scenes were filmed at Lake Como Family Nudist Resort in Lutz, Florida. Karen Sue Trent, about age seven (appearing as Joan in this film) went on to guest star as "Penny Woods" in 14 episodes of Leave It to Beaver four years later.

Plot 
After East Coast businessman Jay Randolph Lattimore approves the designs for a new gymnasium he is donating, he discusses with his attorney and an associate how he has recently undergone a complete personality change: Susan, the widow of Lattimore's son Tom, who was killed in the war, confronts the gruff, bitter Lattimore with the news that she and her six-year-old daughter Joan will no longer be dependent upon him and are leaving his house to move to Miami, where she believes she can resume her modeling career.

Although Lattimore states he will not allow Susan to leave with his granddaughter, he later observes them as they say goodbye to the housekeeper and drive away. Early in the morning, on the outskirts of Tampa, Susan is confused by a detour in the highway, and the car breaks down in a remote area. Fortunately, another driver, Johnny Patterson, is on the road and attempts to fix the car. When he realizes a professional mechanic is required, he invites Susan and Joan to rest at the nearby Garden of Eden resort until a garage opens. After making them comfortable in a cabin at the "members only" resort, Johnny leaves to arrange to have the car worked on, but fails to advise Susan and Joan that they are in the middle of a nudist colony.

Meanwhile, the abandoned car has been found by a Highway Patrol unit and Lattimore is advised. After a short nap, Susan awakens, looks out the cabin window and is surprised to see Joan, and other children, playing without any clothes on. Several naked adults also pass by. When Johnny returns to explain that he is arranging to have her car repaired, Susan tells him that she thinks that the children are delightfully natural naked, but is not convinced about the adults and decides to remain in the cabin until the car is ready. Johnny tells Susan that he is an actor and also works at the camp.

Lattimore, meanwhile, receives a phone call from the police advising him that Susan and Joan are safe at the Garden of Eden, which he assumes is a motel. After Johnny discovers that the car repair will take several days, Susan, fully dressed, wanders outside to meet several of the nudists, including a theater director, who expresses an interest in her acting ability. Later, Joan asks her mother if she feels funny being the only person with clothes on.

Susan is then invited by a male resident, naked from the waist up, to take a ride around the camp's lake in his motorboat. Susan asks to be dropped off on the other side of the lake, where she lies down, falls asleep and dreams of disrobing and swimming naked in the lake. In the dream, Johnny swims up to her, but she is embarrassed by their nudity and asks him to leave. When Susan wakes up, Johnny is there with an update on the car and she tells him that that evening the director has asked them to perform a scene together from Shakespeare's Romeo and Juliet.

Later, during the performance for the clothed theater group, Lattimore arrives at the camp's entrance demanding to take Joan home with him. However, some members persuade him that he is tired and angry and should rest overnight and resume discussions in the morning. Before going to sleep, Lattimore visits Joan, who tells him that she is happy there and wonders why he is so grouchy and makes her mother cry. Early the next morning, unaware that he is in a nudist camp, Lattimore leaves his cabin for a stroll and meets the theater director, whom he recognizes as a famous Shakespearean actor, but is stunned when the man goes swimming naked.

After observing more nudists, Lattimore phones his lawyer demanding that he take action against Susan and Joan, but the lawyer refuses as, he too, is a nudist. Later, Lattimore meets Johnny and apologizes for his conduct the night before and, after wandering around the camp and observing how relaxed everyone is, becomes enthused about nudism and decides to become a member. As Susan is putting Joan to bed, Lattimore comes to apologize to Susan for his years of hateful behavior. When Johnny shows up to take Susan to dinner, he announces that the baby sitter cannot come but he has arranged for Lattimore to do the job.

Johnny and Susan leave as Lattimore begins to tell his granddaughter a bedtime story. Back in the present, Lattimore ends his account of his conversion and his plans to donate a gymnasium to the camp. In the interim, Susan and Johnny have married and are rehearsing a play. All then head for the camp, where they go swimming naked together.

Cast 
Mickey Knox: Johnny Patterson
Jamie O'Hara: Susan Latimore
Karen Sue Trent: Joan Latimore
R. G. Armstrong: J. Randolph Latimore

Court case 
In the late 1950s Garden of Eden was the subject of a court case, Excelsior Pictures vs. New York Board of Regents. The New York State Court of Appeals ruled that onscreen nudity was not obscene, and this ruling opened the door to more open depictions of nudity in film.

References

External links
 
 

Films directed by Max Nosseck
1950s exploitation films
Articles containing video clips
Utopian films
Garden of Eden
Films set in Florida
Films shot in Florida
Obscenity controversies in film
1954 comedy films
1954 films
1950s English-language films
American comedy films
American exploitation films
1950s American films